Bait 3D is a 2012 3D horror disaster film directed by Kimble Rendall based on the screenplay by John Kim and Russell Mulcahy. It featured Sharni Vinson, Phoebe Tonkin, Xavier Samuel, Julian McMahon, Cariba Heine, Alex Russell, Lincoln Lewis, Alice Parkinson, and Dan Wyllie. The film centers around a group of people who try to escape a grocery store, submerged as a result of a freak tsunami, while being hunted by bloodthirsty great white sharks. The film was released on 20 September 2012 in Australia.

Plot
The movie opens with a hungover lifeguard, Josh (Xavier Samuel) being woken up by friend and fellow lifeguard Rory (Richard Brancatisano). Rory tells Josh that he shouldn't have proposed to his sister, Tina (Sharni Vinson) then offers to set a buoy for Josh. Josh visits Tina, who discusses their upcoming move to Singapore. As Rory boards into the ocean to set a buoy, a great white shark appears and kills a man in the water. Alerted to the danger, Josh quickly takes a jet ski and goes to get Rory, but is too late. Rory is pulled into the water, and Josh is unable to save him before he is devoured.

A year later, Josh now works for a supermarket. While stocking shelves with Naomi (Alice Parkinson) he sees Tina with her new boyfriend Steven (Qi Yuwu) returned from Singapore. At the same time two teenagers, Kyle (Lincoln Lewis) and Heather (Cariba Heine) are parked for a make-out session, accompanied by Heather's dog, Bully. In the supermarket, a young woman, Jaime (Phoebe Tonkin) is caught shoplifting, and temporarily evades the security guard by meeting up with her boyfriend Ryan (Alex Russell), who also works at the store. The store manager, Jessup (Adrian Pang) catches up with her, fires Ryan, and calls the police. The arresting officer, Todd (Martin Sacks) arrives and is revealed to be Jaime's dad. After this, Jessup is held at gunpoint by a robber, Doyle (Julian McMahon). The tense situation eventually escalates, and Doyle's partner appears and shoots assistant manager Julie (Rhiannon Dannielle Pettett).

At the height of the commotion, a tsunami wave descends on the city and floods the supermarket. Doyle's partner is killed by the flood and the survivors are forced to take shelter on top of the shelving units in the store. As the survivors try to find a way out, the security guard Colins is dragged underwater and killed. It becomes apparent that a  great white shark has been washed into the store by the tsunami. Additionally, a broken wire threatens to electrocute them all. Steven volunteers to shut off the power and the others dress him in crude armor made of shopping carts/shelves to protect him from the shark. He succeeds but loses his oxygen tube and drowns. Despite their previous conflicts, the survivors work together to get Jessup into a ventilation shaft to go for help. A flood of crabs slides out of the vent, startling Jessup and causing him to fall back, however, he manages to grab hold of the vent. Unfortunately, the shark jumps out of the water and eats Jessup.

In the parking garage, Kyle, Heather, and Ryan have been cut off from the others, surviving the flooding of the car park as their cars were sealed when the water hit and they thus escaped the initial water damage. Ryan helps the couple escape from their drowned car, but a second great white shark is revealed. Kyle ditches the dog, Bully at the last second and they manage to get to temporary safety. After several unsuccessful attempts at luring the shark away, Ryan decides to join them on top of his flipped van, but the shark gives chase. Ryan successfully gets onto the flipped van but Kyle falls and is devoured.

Inside the supermarket, the remaining group make a plan to catch their shark so they can swim to safety. Jaime manages to swim to the butcher section and grab a hook with meat to use as bait. The shark does not go for the bait, so fellow survivor, Kirby (Dan Wyllie) grabs a hook and puts it through Naomi's shirt, using her as bait. Kirby is revealed to be Doyle's partner, who changed out of his clothes and mask so the others wouldn't know he was the murderer. Doyle stabs Kirby with a makeshift harpoon and throws him into the water with the hook. Naomi is pulled from the water as the shark devours Kirby, catching its jaw on the hook and ensnaring itself in the trap. Josh apologizes to Tina, feeling guilty over her brother's death, but Tina reassures him and kisses him.

Below, Bully is found alive. Heather's new-found hope inspires Ryan to start banging on the pipes, calling for help. Jaime hears Ryan's call and with Josh goes to rescue him. Below, they are alerted to the second shark's presence. Josh and Jaime find her dad's car, which has a shotgun and taser in it. Josh kills the shark with the shotgun and the four of them get back into the supermarket. A tremor strikes as they are all swimming to the entrance, breaking the first shark loose. Josh kills the shark with the taser as Doyle wires a truck jammed in the entrance to explode, breaking a hole in the debris and freeing them. The survivors leave the supermarket, reaching the severely damaged city and Tina asks Josh what to do now. At sea, a seagull swoops low over the water and a shark jumps out and devours it.

Cast

Xavier Samuel as Josh
Sharni Vinson as Tina
Adrian Pang as Jessup
Qi Yuwu as Steven
Alex Russell as Ryan
Phoebe Tonkin as Jaime
Martin Sacks as Todd
Alice Parkinson as Naomi
Julian McMahon as Doyle
Dan Wyllie as Kirby
Damien Garvey as Colins
Cariba Heine as Heather
Lincoln Lewis as Kyle
Richard Brancatisano as Rory
Chris Betts as Lockie
Simon Edds as Lifeguard
Miranda Deakin as TV Reporter
Rhiannon Dannielle Pettett as Julie
Skye Fellman as Young Girl
Nicholas McCallum as Oceania Store Owner

Production
Initially, Russell Mulcahy was going to direct the film; however, his involvement with the television series Teen Wolf made this impractical, and so he hired Kimble Rendall to direct instead. The film began shooting on 29 November 2011. Three animatronic sharks were used for filming. Although Rendall wanted to entirely avoid using computer-generated imagery, the budget necessitated that some scenes required its use.

Release
Bait had its premiere at the Venice Film Festival where it was shown out of competition on 1 September 2012. The film was released theatrically on 20 September 2012 Australia and on 29 November 2012 in Singapore.

The film was released on DVD in Australia on 16 January 2013 without the "3D" subtitle as Bait; it was only released in 3D on Blu-ray.

Reception
The film received a 47% approval rating on Rotten Tomatoes based on 32 reviews. Margaret Pomeranz rated the film 3.5/5 stars and said it would appeal to a specific genre audience, while David Stratton rated it 2.5/5 stars and criticized the film for not investing the audience in its characters. Others, such as Jake Wilson of The Age, saw it as a film that is somewhat enjoyable on the basis of being an "awful" film.

Cancelled sequel
Production of a sequel called Deep Water, about a plane en route from China to Australia crashing in the Pacific Ocean, was scrapped in March 2014 due to "uncomfortable similarities" to the disappearance of Malaysia Airlines Flight 370.

References

External links

Smh.com.au

2012 films
2012 horror films
Australian horror films
Singaporean horror films
2012 action thriller films
Australian action horror films
Australian horror thriller films
Films about shark attacks
Films about sharks
Films about tsunamis
Films shot at Village Roadshow Studios
2010s English-language films